Oncopera alboguttata is a moth of the family Hepialidae. It is found in New South Wales and Queensland.

The larvae are subterranean and feed on the roots and bases of grasses in native and sown pastures.

References

Moths described in 1933
Hepialidae